The School of Professional Psychology at Forest Institute (now closed) was founded in 1979 to provide an alternative to the traditional teaching Doctor of Psychology programs of education. The programs were designed for individuals desiring an education to prepare them to serve as direct providers of mental health services rather than researchers or academicians. Programs emphasize a holistic approach to mental wellness grounded in the science and practice of clinical psychology.

Forest Institute operated the Robert J. Murney Clinic in Springfield, Missouri and was one of the few graduate programs in the US to offer its students a free-standing clinic for practicum experience. This "classroom” provided services to members of the local community and offered students the opportunity to apply what they have learned in the classroom.

Forest also supported the Center for Innovation and Community Health, the Center for Continuing Education and numerous programs in the greater Springfield area. These programs are intended to fill needs for mental health services, training and consulting in the metro-area and the surrounding rural communities.

In 2007, its enrollment totaled 221 students (nearly 75% of whom were women), and it awarded 66 doctoral degrees that year. In 2003, its national rank as a doctoral program in psychology in the United States (by volume of doctorates awarded) was 177 out of 200.

The school closed in the fall of 2015, citing financial difficulties following a continued lack of enrollment.  Chapter 11 bankruptcy was filed on September 28, 2018 (https://sbj.net/stories/officials-mum-on-forest-institute-bankruptcy,60735) managed by Ronald Weiss of Kansas City-based Berman, DeLeve, Kuchan & Chapman LLC. A final decree was entered April 2, 2020 citing "Chapter 11 Final Decree - The estate of the above-named debtor(s) has been fully administered. The deposit required by the plan has been distributed. It is Ordered that this Chapter 11 case of the above-named debtor(s) be closed. It is so ORDERED by /s/ Cynthia A. Norton. The Court will serve this Order on parties not receiving electronic notice. This Notice of Electronic Filing is the Official ORDER for this entry. No document is attached. (Graham, Beth)" (https://www.pacermonitor.com/public/case/25776400/Forest_Institute_of_Professional_Psychology). Financial problems beset the institution after accreditation status was reduced to provisional following an audit by the American Psychological Association.  The audit revealed that Forest Institute misrepresented its graduation rate, proportion of student who found gainful employment, and percentage of students placed in internships necessary for graduation and licensure.  To bolster enrollment, several new programs were offered at the Masters level with little to no improvement in enrollment numbers.  Doctoral staff hired to head programs were subsequently released despite relocating after being promised meaningful positions.

Transcripts and psychology internship/residency training records/ verifications have become available through the Association of State and Provincial Psychology Boards (ASPPB) Closed Record Verification Service (CRVS) http://www.asppb.net/?page=ClosedRecord

References

Universities and colleges in Springfield, Missouri
Educational institutions established in 1979
1979 establishments in Missouri